The Electoral district of Railway Officers was an electoral district of the Victorian Legislative Assembly.

Members of Railway Officers

 = resigned in November 1906

See also
 Parliaments of the Australian states and territories
 List of members of the Victorian Legislative Assembly

References

Former electoral districts of Victoria (Australia)
1904 establishments in Australia
1907 disestablishments in Australia